Makoto Watanabe may refer to:
 , Grand Chamberlain of Japan in 1996, Chief of Protocol of Ministry of Foreign Affairs
 Makoto Watanabe, pilot of Japan Airlines Flight 907, involved in the 2001 Japan Airlines mid-air incident
 Makoto Watanabe (artist), featured in Tokyoten
  (1950-), architect, visiting professor at 
  (1952-), architect based in Tokyo
  (1948-2003), French cuisine chef who worked for Imperial Household Agency
 Makoto Watanabe (footballer) (1980-), footballer